The 1917 University of New Mexico football team was an American football team that represented the University of New Mexico as an independent during the 1917 college football season. In its first and only season under head coach Frank E. Wood, the team compiled a 1–2 record and were outscored by a total of 129 to 47. George White was the team captain.

Schedule

References

University of New Mexico
New Mexico Lobos football seasons
University of New Mexico football